Hassan Shirmohammadi (Persian: حسن شیرمحمدی; born May 22, 1968 in Tehran) is a retired Iranian football player.

References 

1966 births
Living people
Iran international footballers
Iranian footballers
Persepolis F.C. players
Iranian expatriate footballers
Expatriate footballers in China
Association football midfielders
Iranian expatriate sportspeople in China
Footballers at the 1994 Asian Games
Asian Games competitors for Iran